Ham and Eggs is a 1933 animated cartoon produced by Walter Lantz, as part of the Oswald the Lucky Rabbit series. It is the 72nd Oswald short by Lantz and the 124th in the entire series.

Plot
At a bistro, Oswald works as the chef while a girl beagle serves as the waitress.

The first customer is a tall terrier who comes in for spaghetti. After finishing his meal, he slowly walks toward the cash register, pretending he would pay his bill. The tall terrier discloses that he has nothing to pay as he quickly exits the door and gives the bistro operators a raspberry. Nevertheless, Oswald and the girl beagle just laugh, knowing they can prevent other customers from running off.

The second customer is a boy beagle with an appetite for pancakes. As he receives his order and tries to take a nibble, the boy beagle finds the pancakes rock solid and therefore too hard to chew on, much to his disgust. He then starts tossing them around, prompting Oswald to tell him that such actions come at a price. Refusing to give a cent, the boy beagle heads toward the door. Before he could do so, however, he is nabbed by the robotic cash register that shakes off every single coin he has.

The third customer is a big bear who orders an egg sandwich. Oswald cracks an egg which turns into a chick and cools itself and while he is in the kitchen, the bear starts flirting the girl beagle, and Oswald is aware of it. Irritated by that, Oswald saws out of two square wooden boards and glues them in between. The bear then receives and takes a bite of the false sandwich, thus resulting in cracked and chipped teeth. Provoked, the bear goes into a frenzy. Oswald, however, is able to evade and fend off the bear's aggression, as the bear tries to catch Oswald but got knocked by Oswald's plan, which is the cash register's money drawer. The bear lands on the floor hitting a cabinet with drawers forcing the bear to feel dazed. Upon bringing their unruly client down, Oswald and the girl beagle put corn kernels plus a lighted oil lamp in the bear's trousers. The corn starts popping inside and the bear runs away hysterically.

The cartoon concludes with Oswald singing in the style of Mario Lanza next to his colleague which he also did in the beginning.

See also
Oswald the Lucky Rabbit filmography

References

External links
The Walter Lantz Cartune Encyclopedia: 1933
Ham and Eggs at the Big Cartoon Database

1933 films
1933 animated films
1930s American animated films
1930s animated short films
Walter Lantz Productions shorts
American black-and-white films
Oswald the Lucky Rabbit cartoons
Universal Pictures animated short films
Cooking films
Animated films about dogs